Pyaasa is a 1957 Indian Hindi drama film directed and produced by Guru Dutt, who stars alongside Mala Sinha, Waheeda Rehman, Rehman, and Johnny Walker. Set in Calcutta, it focuses on the disillusioned Urdu poet Vijay (Dutt), whose works are underestimated by publishers and panned for writing on social issues rather than romantic topics. The film follows his encounters with the golden-hearted prostitute Gulabo (Waheeda Rehman) and his former girlfriend Meena (Sinha), how the former helps him to get his poetry published, the success of his works, and his romantic relationship with Gulabo.

The role of Vijay was initially offered to Dilip Kumar which he declined owing to the impact of doing intense films on his health. Later, in an interview, he also said that he found the character of Vijay in Pyaasa similar to that of Devdas and admitted Pyaasa was one of three movies he regretted turning down. Guru Dutt, later accepted the role himself and the film went on to become one of the most commercially successful movies of the year. Pyaasa is a classic and is considered one of the best films of Indian cinema.  It was remade into the Telugu film Mallepoovu (1978).

Plot
Vijay is an unsuccessful, idealistic Urdu poet in Calcutta whose works are not taken seriously by publishers. They condemn Vijay for writing on social problems such as unemployment and poverty, rather than those on conventional romantic topics. His brothers also dislike his occupation, trying to sell his poems as waste paper. Unable to bear their taunting, he stays away from home and, beside that, find the poems his brother has sold.

Around this time, Vijay encounters a prostitute named Gulabo, who buys and is enamoured with his works and, consequently, falls for him, and his former girlfriend Meena; he finds out that the latter has married the publisher Ghosh due to financial security. Ghosh hires him as a servant to find out more about him and Meena. A dead beggar to whom Vijay gave his coat and whom he tries to save unsuccessfully from the path of a running train is mistaken for Vijay. Gulabo goes to Ghosh and gets his poems published. Ghosh does so feeling he can exploit the poems and make a killing. The poems are very successful. However, Vijay is alive and in the hospital after the train mishap.

Ghosh and Shyam, Vijay's close friend, refuse to recognise him and he is committed to a mental asylum since he insists that he is Vijay and is thought to be mad. Vijay's brothers too are bought off by Ghosh not to recognise him and a memorial is held for the dead poet. Vijay, with the help of his friend Abdul Sattar escapes from the mental asylum and reaches the memorial service, where he denounces this corrupt and materialistic world. Seeing that Vijay is alive, his friend and brothers side with a rival publisher for more money and declare that this is Vijay. At a function to honour him, Vijay becomes sick of all the hypocrisy in the world around him and declares he is not Vijay. He then leaves with Gulabo to start a new life.

Cast 
 Guru Dutt as Vijay
 Mala Sinha as Meena Ghosh
 Waheeda Rehman as Gulabo – This was her first major leading role in Hindi cinema.
 Rehman as Mr. Ghosh
 Johnny Walker as Abdul Sattar
 Leela Mishra as Vijay's mother
 Kumkum as Juhi
 Shyam Kapoor as Shyam
 Mehmood as Vijay's brother
 Tun Tun as Pushplata
 Moni Chatterjee as Chatterjee

Production

Development 
Pyaasa was based on a story idea called Kashmakash, written by Guru Dutt sometime in 1947 or '48, when he was 22. The film's theme and philosophy was inspired by his life experiences in early struggling days of his life. It is also surmised that the story is based on the life of the film's lyricist Sahir Ludhianvi who had a failed affair with poet and writer Amrita Pritam.

Till the project was started in 1956, several changes were made in the original story in assistance with Abrar Alvi like originally the protagonist was to be a painter. In the original ending, Guru Dutt wanted to show that Vijay left all alone, but on the distributors' insistence the ending was changed. There was a debate between writer Abrar Alvi and Dutt on film's ending. Abrar wanted the protagonist to accept and compromise with the prevailing material social reality; Guru Dutt insisted otherwise.

The film was originally titled Pyaas (thirst), but Dutt later changed it to Pyaasa to better describe the film.

Waheeda Rehman's character in Pyaasa was inspired from a real life character. Abrar Alvi and his friends were visiting Bombay and they decided to visit the red light area. Alvi got talking to a girl who called herself Gulabo. According to Alvi "As I left, she thanked me in a broken voice, saying that it was the first time that she had been treated with respect, in a place where she heard only abuses. I used her exact words in the film."

Casting 
Dutt wanted Dilip Kumar to play the leading role in the movie, which the 'tragedy king' declined. One major reason that is cited for the decline is the impact of doing intense films on Dilip Kumar's health. Reportedly, the doctors had advised him to take up lighter roles for sometime. Another possible reason that is cited is the alleged disagreement between him and Dutt over the film's distribution rights. Thus, Dutt himself played the role and movie went on to become one of the most commercially successful movies of the year. 

The role of Shyam was originally to be played by Dutt's real life friend, Johnny Walker, but was then also assigned to one of Dutt's assistant directors.

Pyaasa was to be made with actresses Nargis Dutt and Madhubala in the roles Mala Sinha and Waheeda Rehman played eventually. But the two actresses couldn't decide which role they wanted to play and Dutt eventually opted for two, then new actresses, Mala and Waheeda.

Filming 
Guru Dutt wanted to film red light area scenes on locations in Calcutta (now Kolkata), but the crew was attacked by a group of pimps. Guru Dutt however, recreated sets in Bombay on the basis of photos taken at Kolkata.

Release and reception 
After a slow opening, Pyaasa went on to be a major commercial success of the year. This gave Guru Dutt the confidence to make a repeat on a grand scale. However, Kaagaz Ke Phool went on to be a commercial disaster. The movie picked up a cult following the world over in the 1980s, long after Guru Dutt died.

Soundtrack
The movie boasts one of the best performances of S.D. Burman, Sahir Ludhianvi, Geeta Dutt and Mohammed Rafi to produce one of the most lyrical Hindi musicals. Sahir's work in the film's music was particularly praised; As stated in The Hindu, "While for Pyaasa, a film considered the brainchild of Guru Dutt, the soul behind the film was its lyricist Sahir Ludhianvi". Pyaasa marked the last collaboration of the long-lasting team of composer Burman and lyricist Ludhianvi. 

The popular song "Hum Aapki Aankhon Mein" was added to the movie on behest of distributors to bring some relief in rather pessimistic film. It was never planned in the original cut. The song "Sar Jo Tera Chakraye", actually composed by R.D. Burman, S. D. Burman's son was originally inspired from a tune from the British film Harry Black, which was later released in India as Harry Black and The Tiger. He later recreated it so well that when the producer of Harry Black and the Tiger visited India, he heard the song and not only failed to recognise the tune, but applauded him on it.

In 2004, as part of Sight & Sound's feature "celebrating the relationship between cinema and music", Pyaasa was listed as one of The Best Music in Film and was named by Olivier Assayas as one of his favourites, who called its music as "possibly one of the most remarkable transpositions of poetry on screen."

Restoration
This film has been digitised and restored by Mumbai-based Ultra Media & Entertainment, thus becoming the first Indian film to be restored to its original. As per the report, the original camera negative had come to them from the archives completely melted, with parts damaged or lost. Their biggest challenge was the flickering. Every frame was at a different angle and there was no stability. After several clean-ups, they managed to retrieve the actual content from the original camera negative, but it lacked clarity and depth. 45 restoration experts worked for almost 4 months on over 2 lakh (200,000) frames. The original monaural soundtrack was remastered at 24-bit from the 35 mm optical soundtrack. The company sent it to the 72nd Venice International Film Festival held in 2015, where it competed with 20 other restored classics and was selected to be screened as part of the Venice Classics section along with 11 other films from all over the world.

Legacy 
Pyaasa is regarded as one of the greatest films ever made. It frequently features on world cinema's greatest films lists. It was one of the earliest films to have achieved a healthy blend of artistic as well as commercial mainstream traits.

Filmmakers in India, to this day cite Pyaasa as their inspiration. It is one of the most revered and respected films in India and remains a popular favourite among cinephiles and filmmakers of Hindi Cinema.

It is, in particular, praised for its technical bravura, storytelling, theme and romantic idealism. Its soundtrack was the first major of its type in carrying the narrative forward– utilising songs which are a major part of Hindi Cinema's mainstream films and transposing poetry on screen. In 2004, it's soundtrack was listed by Sight and Sound magazine as one of The Best Music in Film.

The film is considered to be ahead of its time. At the time of its release, the theme of the film was unconventional and hence wasn't widely admired by critics and its acceptance by audience was doubted. It didn't receive any award at the post year's Filmfare ceremony. Even though the film had an unconventional theme and no major actor or actress at the time it was made, Pyaasa managed to be the third highest grosser of the year.

The film received international acclaim in 1980s when it was first released in Europe, subsequently becoming a big commercial success there, long after Guru Dutt died and is now considered a "seminal landmark" in the history of Indian cinema.

Guru Dutt and his later movies, including Pyaasa, have a large cult following, particularly in France, Germany, South Asia and parts of East Asia (Japan, Singapore, etc). It was a huge commercial success during its 1984 French Premiere, something Guru Dutt never witnessed during his lifetime. Since then, the movie has been screened to huge mass appeal the world over, like the recent screening at 72nd Venice International Film Festival held in Italy, in September 2015.

With the commercial success of noirs: Baazi (Navketan Films), Jaal (Navketan Films), Aar Paar; thriller: CID (produced by Dutt), as well as comedy: Mr. & Mrs. '55, Guru Dutt and his studio were financially secure and established. From 1957, he could now make movies he really wanted to make, including Pyaasa.

Pyaasa is often listed among greatest films ever made. In 2002, Pyaasa was ranked among Top 160 on the Sight & Sound critics' and directors' poll of all-time greatest films. In 2005, Pyaasa was the only Hindi film to make it to the "100 Greatest Films of All Time" list by Time magazine, which called it "the soulfully romantic of the lot." In 2017, Taste of Cinema ranked it among "25 Most Influential Asian Movies of All Time".

On the occasion of Valentine's Day 2011, Time declared it as one of the "Top 10 Romantic Movies". It was listed in Taste of Cinema's "Top 30 Best Romantic Movies of All Time" list in 2016. It is frequently voted in Time Reader's Choice Top 10 movies.

Indiatimes ranks it among "25 Must See Bollywood Movies". On the centenary of Indian cinema in 2013, CNN- IBN listed it among "100 Greatest Indian films of all time", calling it "The most soulful romantic Hindi film ever made". It was also included among NDTV's "20 Greatest Indian Films" citing, "the cinematic mastery on display in Pyaasa has rarely been replicated in mainstream Indian cinema"; British Film Institute's "Top 5 of India's Greatest Films" poll in 2002; Time "Top 3 of Bollywood's Best Classics"; Esquire's '10 Best Bollywood Movies' calling it, "the ultimate posthumous dream"; Outlook 'Top 5 of Hindi Cinema's Greatest Films' poll of 25 leading Indian Directors in 2003; Time-Out's 'Top 5 of Bollywood's Best Movies' poll in 2015 and numerous other polls of greatest films.

In 2013, to celebrate the centenary year of Indian cinema by selecting one essential Indian film from each decade, The Guardian named Pyaasa as the 'Quintessential Indian Classic of 1950s' decade citing, "The 1950s is the hardest decade from which to pick a film. Guru Dutt's melodramatic Pyaasa or 'The desirous one' is 'extraordinary', a film that draws on all the features of a mainstream movie to achieve a high aesthetic, from the beautiful photography of the Christ-like tormented poet, the beauty of the streetgirl (Waheeda Rehman) and the wonderful music with some of the great Sahir Ludhianvi's best lyrics." In 2019, the British Film Institute named it the 'Greatest Musical of 1957', stating, "Until his tragic overdose in 1964, its director-producer-star Guru Dutt was one of Indian cinema's boldest talents and Pyaasa is his masterpiece." It was also part of BFI Screen Guides' 100 Film Musical book.

In 2011, the British author Nasreen Munni Kabir published The Dialogue of Pyaasa, which contains original dialogues for the film in Hindi and Urdu as well as its translation in English.

References

Bibliography

External links
 
 Urbain Bizot, Thirst and Mourning
 "Pyaasa:Time Magazine All Time 100 Movies"
 University of Iowa article

1957 films
1950s Hindi-language films
Films directed by Guru Dutt
Films scored by S. D. Burman
Films with screenplays by Abrar Alvi
Films set in Kolkata
Films shot in Kolkata
Films shot in Mumbai
Indian drama films
Indian epic films
Films about prostitution in India
Hindi films remade in other languages
Urdu films remade in other languages
1950s Urdu-language films
Urdu-language Indian films
1957 drama films
Hindi-language drama films